The 2020–21 Serie C was the seventh season of the unified Serie C division, the third tier of the Italian football league system.

Teams 
The league was initially to be contested by 60 teams, but was reduced to 59 following the exclusion of Trapani.

Relegated from Serie B 
Perugia
Trapani (subsequently excluded)
Juve Stabia
Livorno

Promoted from Serie D 
Lucchese (Girone A winners)
Pro Sesto (Girone B winners)
Legnago (Girone C runners-up)
Mantova (Girone D winners)
Grosseto (Girone E winners)
Matelica (Girone F winners)
Turris (Girone G winners)
Foggia (Girone H winners)
Palermo (Girone I winners)

Readmissions
Following the disbandment of Sicula Leonzio and Siena, two relegated clubs were readmitted as members of Serie C.
Giana Erminio
Ravenna

During the season
On 4 October 2020, Trapani was excluded from the league after failing to play two consecutive matches.

Stadia and locations

Group A (North & Central West) 
8 teams from Lombardy, 6 teams from Tuscany, 4 teams from Piedmont, 1 team from Emilia-Romagna and 1 team from Sardinia.

Group B (North & Central East) 
5 teams from Emilia-Romagna, 5 teams from Marche, 3 teams from Veneto, 2 teams from Lombardy, 2 teams from Umbria, 1 team from Friuli-Venezia Giulia, 1 team from Trentino-Alto Adige/Südtirol and 1 team from Tuscany.

Group C (Centre & South) 
6 teams from Campania, 5 teams from Apulia, 3 teams from Sicily, 2 teams from Calabria, 1 team from Abruzzo, 1 team from Basilicata, 1 team from Lazio and 1 from Umbria.

League tables

Group A (North & Central West)

Group B (North & Central East)

Group C (Centre & South)

Promotion play-offs 
A total of 28 teams qualified for the promotion play-offs. The winner of the play-offs earns promotion to Serie B.

First preliminary round 
The fixtures pair the 5th vs 10th, 6th vs 9th and 7th vs 8th-placed teams. In the group with the best 4th-placed team, the 5th placed team advances automatically to the second preliminary round and the revised fixtures are 6th vs 11th, 7th vs 10th and 8th vs 9th. If teams are tied after regular time, the higher-placed team advances. 

Matches were played on 9 May 2021. The Triestina vs Virtus Verona game, originally scheduled to be played on 9 May 2021, was delayed due to eight cases of COVID-19 infection involving the latter club. Match was later played on 16 May 2021.

|}

Second preliminary round 
The fixtures pair the 4th-placed team vs the worst-placed team and the best-placed team vs the 2nd best-placed team from the first preliminary round. The best 4th-placed team in regular season advances automatically to the first national round and their berth is transferred to the 5th-placed team of the same group. If teams are tied after regular time, the higher-placed team advances. 

Matches were played on 19 May 2021.

|}

First national round 
The three 3rd-placed teams, the best 4th-placed team and the best-placed team from the second preliminary round (Bari) are seeded and host the second leg. No away goal rule applies. If teams are tied on aggregate, the seeded team advances. 

The draw for the first national round was held on 20 May 2021, 11:00 CEST (UTC+2). The first legs were played on 23 May 2021 and the second legs were played on 26 May 2021.

|}

Second national round 
The three 2nd-placed teams and the best-placed team from the first national round (Südtirol) are seeded and host the second leg. No away goal rule applies. If teams are tied on aggregate, the seeded team advances. 

The draw for the second national round was held on 27 May 2021, 11:00 CEST (UTC+2). The first legs were played on 30 May 2021 and the second legs were played on 2 June 2021.

|}

Final Four 
No away goal rule applies. If teams are tied on aggregate, the winner is decided by extra-time and a penalty shootout if required.

The draw for Final Four was held on 27 May 2021, 11:00 CEST (UTC+2), after the second national round draw. The semi-finals legs were played on 6 and 9 June 2021 and the final legs were played on 13 and 17 June 2021.

Alessandria promoted to Serie B.

Relegation play-outs
A total of 6 teams qualified for the relegation play-outs. The fixtures pair the 16th vs 19th and 17th vs 18th-placed teams, with higher-placed team playing at home for second leg. No away goal rule applies. If teams are tied on aggregate, the lower-placed team is relegated to Serie D. 

The first legs were played on 15 May 2021 and the second legs were played on 22 May 2021. The Fano vs Imolese game was postponed due to a cluster of confirmed COVID-19 cases involving the former team. Match was played on 22 May 2021, whilst the second leg was played on 29 May 2021.

|}

Top goalscorers

Note
1 Player scored 1 goal in the play-offs.
3 Player scored 3 goals in the play-offs.

References

External links
 Official website

Serie C seasons
3
Italy